Cody Lampl (born June 19, 1986) is an American-German professional ice hockey defenseman currently playing in the Deutsche Eishockey Liga (DEL) for the Straubing Tigers.

He holds a German passport, his grandparents emigrated from Germany to the United States.

Playing career
Before the 2011-12 season on September 12, 2011, the Idaho Steelheads traded Lampl to the Utah Grizzlies in exchange for future considerations.

On August 21, 2012, Lampl signed as a free agent to a one-year contract with the Toledo Walleye of the ECHL.

Lampl was invited to attend the St. John's IceCaps training camp for the 2013–14 season. On the eve of the opening night, he was signed to a one-year AHL contract with the IceCaps on October 5, 2013.

On August 12, 2014, Lampl signed a one-year contract in a return with the Toledo Walleye for the 2014–15 season. Lampl remained with the Walleye for the duration of the season posting career highs with 8 goals and 30 points in 62 games. After a Conference Final elimination, Lampl opted to sign a European contract with German club, the Fischtown Pinguins of the DEL2 on May 29, 2015. The Pinguins were granted a license for Germany's top-tier Deutsche Eishockey Liga (DEL) for the 2016–17 season.

After three seasons with Fischtown, Lampl left at the conclusion of his contract and opted to sign as a free agent to a two-year contract with Adler Mannheim on April 16, 2018.

Lampl enjoyed three season with Adler Mannheim before he was signed to a one-year contract to join his third DEL club, the Straubing Tigers, on May 7, 2021.

Career statistics

Awards and honors

References

External links

1986 births
Living people
Adler Mannheim players
American people of German descent
Abbotsford Heat players
American men's ice hockey defensemen
Chicago Steel players
Colorado College Tigers men's ice hockey players
Danville Wings (USHL) players
Fischtown Pinguins players
Grand Rapids Griffins players
Ice hockey people from Idaho
Idaho Steelheads (ECHL) players
Las Vegas Wranglers players
People from Ketchum, Idaho
St. John's IceCaps players
Sioux Falls Stampede players
Straubing Tigers players
Toledo Walleye players
Utah Grizzlies (ECHL) players